Pudukkottai division is a revenue division in the Pudukkottai district of Tamil Nadu, India.

References 
 

Pudukkottai district